"You Make the Whole World Cry" is the only single to be released from the album Eleven Kinds of Loneliness by British musician Tanita Tikaram. The record was issued on 10 February 1992 via East West Records label. In 1996 the song was included in her album The Best of Tanita Tikaram.

Music video
The song's music video was directed by Tony Kaye. It was shot in Los Angeles and featured Tikaram in a number of costumes, one of which portrayed the fictional character Tin Woodman.

Critical reception
Upon its release as a single, Music & Media noted the song's "rumbling drums" and felt it track "shows [Tikaram's] move into Walker Brothers territory". Peter Kinghorn of the Newcastle Evening Chronicle commented that the song shows "her huskily moody voice at its expressive best". Jim Lawn of the Lennox Herald stated, "A plaintive cry with a slow burning build-up which combine brilliantly to suggest a massive hit!"

David Stubbs of Melody Maker was critical of the song, writing, "This time, she's produced herself, embellishing her exercise-book poetry with a Phil Spector production that bursts in like the cavalry when her larynx seems just about to give out. I predict small things for this one." Penny Kiley of Liverpool Echo describing it as "over-produced" and added, "It is hard to pick out a song or tune, and Tanita's voice, sometimes so effective, just seems to be droning on this." Patrick O'Flynn of the Hull Daily Mail gave a two star rating and described it as "uninspiring". He commented, "Released with two new acoustic tracks on the B-side, 'You Make the Whole World Cry' disappoints principally because Ms Tikaram seems to believe she can sustain a career simply by looking and sounding depressed."

In a review of Eleven Kinds of Loneliness, David Quantick of NME noted it "builds up in a weird sort of Leonard Cohen-meets-the-Eurythmics manner". Adam Sweeting of The Guardian felt "both tune and lyrics are buried under thundering timpani". Len Righi of The Morning Call described the "edgy, falling-in-love song" as "Spectoresque in the best sense".

Track listing

Credits and personnel
 Tanita Tikaram – vocals, backing vocals, guitar
 David Hayes – guitar, bass
 Mark Creswell – guitar
 Bob Noble, Rod Argent – keyboards
 Richie Buckley – saxophone
 Nic France – drums, percussion

Production
 Tanita Tikaram – producer
 Simon Hurrell – engineer, mixing
 Mark Creswell, Nic France – mixing
 Tim Young – mastering
 Peter Van Hooke, Rod Argent – producers of "This Stranger"

Other
 Stefano Massei – photography
 Bill Smith Studio – design

References

1992 singles
1992 songs
East West Records singles
Songs written by Tanita Tikaram
Tanita Tikaram songs